Nathalie Suivestin (born 2 July 1976) is a retired Malagasy football striker.

References

1976 births
Living people
Malagasy footballers
Madagascar international footballers
SO Emyrne players
Léopards de Transfoot players
Association football forwards